The Lancashire League is a competitive league of local cricket clubs drawn from the small to middle-sized mill towns, mainly but not exclusively, of East Lancashire. Its real importance is probably due to its history of employing professional players of international standing to play in the League.

History
The Lancashire Cricket League was formed on 16 March 1892, growing from the North East Cricket League that had been formed 17 months earlier. Currently in membership are Accrington CC, Bacup CC, Burnley CC, Church CC, Clitheroe CC, Colne CC, Crompton CC, Darwen Cricket Club, East Lancashire CC, Enfield CC, Great Harwood, Greenmount CC, Haslingden CC, Littleborough CC, Lowerhouse CC, Middleton CC, Nelson CC, Norden CC, Ramsbottom CC, Rawtenstall CC, Rishton CC, Rochdale CC, Todmorden CC (actually in Yorkshire) and Walsden CC (also in W Yorks). In the early years Bury CC were also members but they withdrew after participating for just two seasons.

The early 1890s saw the sudden emergence of cricket leagues all over Lancashire, with the first in 1888 ‑ the Bolton Association. The North Lancashire League and the Central Lancashire League all started the same year as the Lancashire League in 1892. The Football League had set a trend in season 1888‑89 and also had its heart in Lancashire, and with professionals and regular friendlies and local derbies, the leagues quickly became very popular institutions, with games played at weekends when working people had rare leisure time.

In the early years, until 1899, it was possible for each team to field two professionals, but this was restricted for the 1900 season to one professional. The League Centenary was celebrated in 1992, and in 1998 a major exhibition about the League was mounted by Horse and Bamboo Theatre at their Centre with the involvement of the author Ron Freethy.

In 1981 the name was amended to include the name of a sponsor, initially Blackburn brewer Matthew Brown, later E.W.Cartons and Sponsorbank, among others, and currently Fosters.

The Lancashire League in its first season of 1892 consisted of only 13 clubs (the 14 current members minus Todmorden) before Bury played in 1893 and 1894 to give the league 14 clubs. Bury left for the 1895 season before Todmorden joined in 1897. The membership of the league did not then change for another 120 years, until three new clubs – Clitheroe, Darwen and Great Harwood – joined in 2017. In 2018 the number of member clubs was increased to 24 with the admission of Crompton, Norden, Littleborough, Middleton, Milnrow, Rochdale and Walsden.
However, in 2019 Milnrow resigned from the league after only two seasons, to be replaced in 2020 by Bury's Greenmount CC.

In addition Edenfield entered the 20/20 Cup between 2007 and 2014 but did not enter any other Lancashire League competition.

Senior competitions

1st XI League
In 2018 the 24 clubs will play each other once only. The top 12 teams will form the upper division in 2019 and the bottom 12 teams will form the lower division. Games start out as 50 over matches but if rain affects play they can be reduced to a minimum of 20 overs. The method for working out reduced targets is to take 3/4 of the first innings run rate off the first innings score for every over that is lost in the second innings. One over is lost for every 7 minutes in the first innings and every 3½ minutes in the second innings. The second innings can be less than 20 overs as long as there were more than 20 overs bowled in the first innings and the team batting second believe they can chase the full total posted in the first innings or the team bowling second believe they can bowl their opponents out in the allocated overs. If the team batting second get the full total then they win. If the team bowling second bowl out the team batting second then they win. If neither team does this then it is a No Result. For example, Lowerhouse scored 124–7 off their allocated 31 overs. Nelson opted to chase 125 for victory off 12 overs. They ended up on 82–7 so neither team won and it was a no result. 10 points are awarded for a win, 7 points for a tie, 3 points for a no result and 2 points for bowling the opposition out. Up to 5 bonus points are then awarded to the team who lost. If the team that lost bowled second they get 1-point for 5 wickets, 2 for 6 wickets, 3 for 7 wickets, 4 for 8 wickets and 5 for 9 wickets. If they batted second they get 1-point for being within 50 runs, 2 points for being within 40 runs, 3 points for being within 30 runs, 4 points for being within 20 runs and 5 points for being within 10 runs. 1 point is deducted for slow over rate in an innings of more than 40 overs. One over is expected to be bowled in 3¾ minutes. One bowler may bowl up to 17 overs while no other bowlers may bowl more than 14 overs.

Worsley Cup
Every club in the league competes in this knockout tournament with two teams being given a random bye to the second round (there are four rounds in all). All games have to be 50 overs and if not completed on the given date have to be continued on weeknights or, if still in the first innings, the following Saturday. The first game is generally played on a Sunday and the reserve date is always a Saturday. Bowlers can bowl no more than 10 overs each.

Ron Singleton Colne Trophy
The League winner plays the Worsley Cup winner in this competition. If a team wins both competitions then the Double winners play the team that finished second the previous year. It is played on the Saturday before the League starts. It is played to the same match rules as the Worsley Cup except that overs are deducted for bad weather. The Colne Trophy has to be a minimum of 20 overs. If the game cannot be completed then the trophy is shared.

20/20 Cup
There are 3 groups, 2 consisting of 6 and one group consisting of 5 and the top 3 clubs from each group (top 2 from the group of 5) go through to the quarter-final. In the group stage each team plays each other team once. 2 points are awarded for a win and 1 point for a tie. Each team must face a minimum of five overs for a game to be valid. The method for working out reduced targets is to subtract the full run rate for every over lost in the second innings. Games are played mainly on a Friday night but are occasionally played on a Thursday night. Teams can play in colours if they wish. In Group A are Accrington Cricket Club, Darwen Cricket Club, East Lancashire Cricket Club, Lowerhouse Cricket Club, Ramsbottom Cricket Club, Todmorden Cricket Club. . In Group B are Burnley Cricket Club, Clitheroe cricket club, Colne Cricket Club, Edenfield Cricket Club, Haslingden Cricket Club and Nelson Cricket Club. Group C consists of current holders Church Cricket Club, Bacup Cricket Club, Great Harwood Cricket Club, Rawtenstall Cricket Club and Rishton Cricket Club. In the Cup's inaugural year it was a knockout tournament involving 12 clubs as Enfield and Todmorden did not compete. In 2006 it was a 14 club tournament with the same format as today except the Rossendale Valley group only had 4 clubs in it. Edenfield joined the Cup in 2007 to give the Rossendale Valley group 5 clubs. Bowlers can bowl no more than 4 overs.

2nd XI League
Same rules as the 1st XI League except that no games are replayed and no bowler may bowl more than 14 overs.

Lancashire Telegraph Cup
All 2nd XIs enter. Same rules as the Worsley Cup with the 1st Round being the reverse fixtures of the Worsley Cup 1st Round. Games are played on the same date as the Worsley Cup with the exception that the Cup final is played the week before the Worsley Cup final.

The professionals
The existence of the Lancashire League is a testament to local cricketers and their supporters, but the sheer quantity and quality of the professional cricketers that have been drawn to the milltowns of East Lancashire and the surrounding area is astonishing. Players from all over the world have come to live and play in the League including: Dik Abed, Bill Alley, Nyron Asgarali, Nathan Astle, Sydney Barnes, Allan Border, Chris Cairns, Michael Clarke, Sir Learie Constantine, Kapil Dev, Allan Donald, Bruce Dooland, Roy Gilchrist, Dennis Lillee, Trevor Chappell, Jason Gillespie, Kerry O'Keeffe, Charlie Griffith, Andrew Hall, Wes Hall, Roger Harper, Chris Harris, George Headley, Michael Holding, Murali Kartik, Charlie Llewellyn, Clive Lloyd, Manny Martindale, Mark Orchard, Cec Pepper, Viv Richards, Andy Roberts, Fred Root, Jacques Rudolph, Peter Sleep, 'Big' Jim Smith, Hugh Tayfield, George Tribe, Lou Vincent, Shane Warne, Chester Watson, Steve Waugh, Bilawal Bhatti, Alviro Petersen, Robin Peterson and Everton Weekes. It is a rule of the competition that each team must have a professional player in their squad. Should the professional be unavailable then a substitute must be found. Teams not playing a pro can be fined.

Documentaries

Beyond a Boundary
In C.L.R. James' autobiographical Beyond a Boundary, the Trinidadian writer writes about his visits as a young man to his friend Learie Constantine, at that time living in Nelson while playing as a professional for the town Lancashire League team. He gives a vivid sense of what it must have been like for a young West Indian to arrive in the wet and strange East Lancashire. He also describes how his subsequent education at university in Paris is helped by a local baker, and how his gradual politicisation is given a boost by meetings with local socialists, concerned with the harsh treatment and conditions suffered by the local working class millworkers. Although an extreme example, the meetings between other professional cricketers from the British Empire, and the mainly working-class amateurs of the Lancashire League, must have resulted in many other instances of mutual support and understanding.

Race and Pace: West Indians in the East Lancashire League
The league and its relationship with West Indies professional cricketers is the subject of a 2017 BBC television documentary: Race and Pace: West Indians in the East Lancashire League. The film features original footage of the players, shots of the ground and interviews with Wes Hall, Viv Richards, David Lloyd, and Learie Constantine's daughter.

Honours

2019
1st XI Championship – Burnley 
Worsley Cup – Darwen 
Lancashire Knockout Cup – Lowerhouse 
20/20 Cup – Ramsbottom 
Ron Singleton Colne Trophy – Walsden 
2nd XI Championship – Clitheroe 
Lancashire Telegraph Cup – Ramsbottom 
3rd XI Championship – Ramsbottom

2018
1st XI Championship – Walsden 
Worsley Cup – Lowerhouse 
Lancashire Knockout Cup – Darwen 
20/20 Cup – Burnley
Ron Singleton Colne Trophy – Burnley 
2nd XI Championship – Walsden 
Lancashire Telegraph Cup – Walsden 
3rd XI Championship – Walsden

2017
1st XI Championship – Clitheroe –  
Worsley Cup – Darwen 
Lancashire Knockout Cup – Lowerhouse  
20/20 Cup – Clitheroe
Ron Singleton Colne Trophy – Ramsbottom 
2nd XI Championship – Darwen 
Lancashire Telegraph Cup – Darwen 
3rd XI Championship – Clitheroe

2016
1st XI Championship – Ramsbottom
Worsley Cup – Burnley 
Lancashire Knockout Cup – (Church, Enfield, Lowerhouse and Todmorden entered) 
20/20 Cup – Church
Ron Singleton Colne Trophy – Enfield 
2nd XI Championship – Todmorden
Lancashire Telegraph Cup – Haslingden 
3rd XI Championship – Haslingden

2015
1st XI Championship – Burnley 
Worsley Cup – Burnley 
Lancashire Knockout Cup – (Church, Enfield, Lowerhouse and Todmorden entered) 
20/20 Cup – Burnley
Ron Singleton Colne Trophy – Burnley 
2nd XI Championship – Burnley
Lancashire Telegraph Cup – Ramsbottom 
3rd XI Championship – Haslingden

2014
1st XI Championship – Lowerhouse 
Worsley Cup – Burnley 
Lancashire Knockout Cup – (Church, Enfield, Lowerhouse and Todmorden entered) 
20/20 Cup – Church 
Ron Singleton Colne Trophy – Accrington 
2nd XI Championship – Nelson 
Lancashire Telegraph Cup – East Lancashire 
3rd XI Championship – Lowerhouse

2013
1st XI Championship – Accrington 
Worsley Cup – Burnley 
Lancashire Knockout Cup – (Church, Enfield, Lowerhouse and Todmorden entered) 
20/20 Cup – Lowerhouse 
Ron Singleton Colne Trophy – Accrington 
2nd XI Championship – Ramsbottom 
Lancashire Telegraph Cup – Nelson 
3rd XI Championship – Nelson

2012
1st XI Championship – Lowerhouse 
Worsley Cup – Lowerhouse 
Lancashire Knockout Cup – Bamford Fieldhouse (Saddleworth & District Cricket League) (Accrington, Church, Lowerhouse, Ramsbottom and Todmorden entered) 
20/20 Cup – Ramsbottom 
Ron Singleton Colne Trophy – Lowerhouse and Ramsbottom 
2nd XI Championship – Haslingden 
Lancashire Telegraph Cup – Haslingden 
3rd XI Championship – Enfield

2011
1st XI Championship – Lowerhouse 
Worsley Cup – Ramsbottom 
Lancashire Knockout Cup – Greenmount (Bolton Cricket League) (Colne, East Lancashire, Haslingden and Todmorden entered) 
20/20 Cup – Ramsbottom 
Ron Singleton Colne Trophy – Ramsbottom 
2nd XI Championship – Nelson 
Lancashire Telegraph Cup – Ramsbottom 
3rd XI Championship – Haslingden

2010
1st XI Championship – Ramsbottom 
Worsley Cup – Colne 
Lancashire Knockout Cup – Farnworth (Bolton Cricket League) (East Lancashire and Ramsbottom entered) 
20/20 Cup – Ramsbottom 
Ron Singleton Colne Trophy – Ramsbottom 
2nd XI Championship – Church 
Lancashire Telegraph Cup – Church 
3rd XI Championship – Enfield

2009
1st XI Championship – Accrington 
Worsley Cup – Ramsbottom 
Lancashire Knockout Cup – Bootle (Liverpool & District Cricket Competition) (Accrington, Lowerhouse and Nelson entered) 
20/20 Cup – Burnley 
Ron Singleton Colne Trophy – Todmorden 
2nd XI Championship – Nelson 
Lancashire Telegraph Cup – Nelson 
3rd XI Championship – Nelson

2008
1st XI Championship – Accrington 
Worsley Cup – Accrington 
Lancashire Knockout Cup – Walkden (Bolton Cricket League) (East Lancashire and Rawtenstall entered) 
20/20 Cup – East Lancashire 
Ron Singleton Colne Trophy – East Lancashire 
2nd XI Championship – Nelson 
Lancashire Telegraph Cup – Nelson 
3rd XI Championship – Haslingden

2007
1st XI Championship – Rishton 
Worsley Cup – East Lancashire 
20/20 Cup – Enfield 
Ron Singleton Colne Trophy – Burnley 
2nd XI Championship – Ramsbottom 
Lancashire Telegraph Cup – Ramsbottom 
3rd XI Championship – Nelson

2006
1st XI Championship – Burnley 
Worsley Cup – Nelson 
Inter League Club Challenge Trophy – East Lancashire 
20/20 Cup – Rishton 
Ron Singleton Colne Trophy – Ramsbottom 
2nd XI Championship – Ramsbottom 
Lancashire Telegraph Cup – Ramsbottom 
3rd XI Championship – Burnley

2005
1st XI Championship – Lowerhouse 
Worsley Cup – Ramsbottom 
Inter League Club Challenge Trophy – Littleborough (Central Lancashire League) 
20/20 Cup – Haslingden 
Ron Singleton Colne Trophy – Match abandoned 
2nd XI Championship – Haslingden 
Lancashire Telegraph Cup – Ramsbottom 
3rd XI Championship – Haslingden

References

External links
Lancashire League website
Lancashire Telegraph
Lancashire League Handbook (2020)

English domestic cricket competitions
Cricket in Lancashire
Sports leagues established in 1892
1892 establishments in England